The Spanish miracle refers to a period of exceptionally rapid development and growth across all major areas of economic activity in Spain during the latter part of the Francoist regime, from 1959 to 1974, in which GDP averaged a 6.5 percent growth rate per year, and was itself part of a much longer period of an above average GDP growth rate from 1951 to 2007. The economic boom came to an end with the 1970s international oil and stagflation crises that disrupted the industrialised world although several  scholars have argued that "liabilities accumulated during years of frenzied pursuit of economic development" were in fact to blame for the slow economic growth of the late 1970s.

Initiation of boom 

The "economic miracle" was initiated by the reforms promoted by the so-called technocrats who, with Francisco Franco's approval, put in place policies developed in Spain. The technocrats, many of whom were members of Opus Dei, were a new breed of politicians and replaced the old Falangist guard.

Industrialization

The rapid economic expansion reinvigorated old industrial areas: the Basque Country and Ferrol northern coast (iron and steel, shipbuilding), and in and around Barcelona (machinery, textiles, cars and petrochemicals). It also drove an enormous expansion in refining, petrochemicals, chemicals and engineering. To help achieve the rapid development, there was massive government investment through key state owned companies like the national industrial conglomerate Instituto Nacional de Industria, the mass market car company SEAT in Barcelona, the big steel plant of Ensidesa in Avilés and the shipbuilder Empresa Nacional Bazán. With heavy protection from foreign competition in the domestic Spanish market, those companies led the industrialisation of the country, restoring the prosperity of industrial areas like Barcelona and Bilbao and creating new industrial areas, most notably around Madrid. Although there was economic liberalisation in the period, key enterprises remained under state control.

Automotive industry
The automotive industry was one of the most powerful  (locomotives) of the Spanish Miracle. From 1958 to 1972, it grew at a yearly compound rate of 21.7%. In 1946, there were only 72,000 private cars in Spain, but in 1966, there were over 1 million. That growth rate had no equal in the world.
The icon of the desarrollo was the SEAT 600 car, produced by the Spanish state company SEAT. More than 794,000 of them were made between 1957 and 1973. At the beginning of that period, it was the first car for many Spanish working-class families. However, at the end of the period, it was the second car for many more.

See also 
 Economic history of Spain
 Economic miracle
 Instituto Nacional de Industria
 Pegaso
 SEAT
 Spain under Franco

References 

1950s economic history
1960s economic history
1970s economic history
1950s in Spain
1960s in Spain
1970s in Spain
Economic booms
Economic history of Spain
Francoist Spain
Post–World War II economic booms